The Mustering-out Payment Act is a United States federal law passed in 1944. It provided money to servicemen, returning from the Second World War, to help them restart their lives as civilians.

See also
Demobilization
World War II
Federal law (United States)
Serviceman
G.I. Bill

Sources 

1944 in law
History of veterans' affairs in the United States
United States federal veterans' affairs legislation
United States federal legislation articles without infoboxes